24thAnnie Awards
November 10, 1996

Best Feature Film: 
Toy Story

Best Television Program: 
The Simpsons

Best Home Video Production: 
The Land Before Time III

Best Short Subject: 
Cow and Chicken

The 24th Annie Awards were given by the International Animated Film Association to honor outstanding achievements in animation in 1996. The Hunchback of Notre Dame led the nominations with 13. Toy Story won 7 awards out of its 8 nominations. The Simpsons won Best Animated Television Program for the fifth time in a row.

Production Categories 
Winners are listed first, highlighted in boldface, and indicated with a double dagger.

Outstanding individual achievement

Juried awards
Winsor McCay Award Recognition for career contributions to the art of animation
 Mary Blair Posthumous recognition
 Burny Mattinson
 Iwao Takamoto

June Foray Award Recognition of benevolent/charitable impact on the art and industry of animation
 Bill Littlejohn
 Fini Littlejohn

Multiple wins and nominations

The following eightproductions received multiple nominations:

Only one production received multiple awards:

External links
 Annie Awards 1996 at Internet Movie Database

1996
1996 film awards
Annie
Annie